Benjamin Van Meurs (born 31 January 1998), is an Australian professional soccer player who plays as a defender and is currently a free agent.

References

External links

1998 births
Living people
Australian soccer players
Association football defenders
Sydney FC players
Tai Po FC players
National Premier Leagues players
Hong Kong Premier League players